Colonel Cody may refer to:
 William Frederick "Buffalo Bill" Cody, American soldier and showman
 Samuel Franklin Cody, Wild West showman and early pioneer of manned flight